Ghozali Muharam Siregar (born 7 July 1992) is an Indonesian professional footballer who plays as a winger for Liga 1 club Persita Tangerang.

Club career

PSM Makassar
He was signed for PSM Makassar to play in Liga 1. Ghozali made his league debut on 16 April 2017 in a match against Persela Lamongan at the Andi Mattalatta Stadium, Makassar.

Persib Bandung
In 2018, Ghozali signed a contract with Indonesian Liga 1 club Persib Bandung. He made his league debut on 1 April 2018 in a match against Sriwijaya. On 26 July 2018, Ghozali scored his first goal for Persib against Persebaya Surabaya in the 53rd minute at the Gelora Bung Tomo Stadium, Surabaya.

PSMS Medan
In 2021, Ghozali signed a contract with Indonesian Liga 2 club PSMS Medan. He made his league debut on 7 October against KS Tiga Naga at the Gelora Sriwijaya Stadium, Palembang.

Persita Tengerang
Ghozali was signed for Persita Tangerang to play in Liga 1 in the 2022–23 season. He made his league debut on 25 July 2022 in a match against Persik Kediri at the Indomilk Arena, Tangerang.

Honours

Club
Pro Duta
 Indonesian Premier League: 2013

References

External links 
 
 Ghozali Siregar at Liga Indonesia

1992 births
Living people
Indonesian footballers
People of Batak descent
Pro Duta FC players
Pelita Bandung Raya players
Persegres Gresik players
Gresik United players
PSM Makassar players
Persib Bandung players
PSMS Medan players
Persita Tangerang players
Indonesian Premier League players
Liga 1 (Indonesia) players
Liga 2 (Indonesia) players
Indonesia youth international footballers
Sportspeople from North Sumatra
Association football forwards